Cimandaway or Curug Cimandaway is a waterfall on the Cikawalon River, at Datar village, Dayeuhluhur, Cilacap, Central Java, Java Island, Indonesia.

Waterfalls of Java
Cilacap Regency
Dayeuhluhur